Dr. Morris Meister (1895 - 1975) was a science educator and administrator who was the founder and first principal of the Bronx High School of Science as well as the first president of Bronx Community College. He is noteworthy for his support and application of laboratory-based methods in science education as well as interdisciplinary study.

Early life and education 
Morris Meister was born on October 20, 1895, in Gonietz, Poland to Harris Meister and Jennie (Kolovsky) Meister. The Meister family moved to Manhattan's Lower East Side when Morris was 7 years old. He attended the City College of New York, where he became a member of Phi Beta Kappa. His doctoral thesis at the Teachers College of Columbia University in 1921, The Educational Value of Certain After-school Materials and Activities in Science, focused on the role of science related toys in science education.

Meister married Florence Suzi Glickstein, a music teacher, in 1921. They had two children, Anna Meister Burton, a psychoanalyst, and Alton Meister, a noted biochemist.

Career 
Morris Meister worked as a science teacher in a number of schools in New York City including Stuyvesant High School (1916), The Speyer School (1916-1918), Horace Mann School (1917-1922). He was instrumental in the creation of science fairs while working as a committee head of the American Institute of the City of New York in the 1932s.  He served as the second president of the National Science Teachers Association. Meiseter wrote a series of science textbooks called Science for a Better World. Meister was the founding principal of the Bronx High School of Science from 1938 to 1958. He was the founding president of the Bronx Community College from 1959 to 1966. After retirement he worked as the director of planning at the New York Hall of Science, in Corona, Queens. .

Legacy 

Meister Auditorium, the Auditorium of the Bronx High School of Science, is named after Dr. Meister. His portrait is displayed at its doors.

Meister Hall, a building on the campus of Bronx Community College, is named after Dr. Meister.

References

External links 
A Tribute to Founder Dr. Morris Meister (Bronx Science)
BCC: History of the College

American school principals
Year of death missing
The Bronx High School of Science
Heads of universities and colleges in the United States
Bronx Community College faculty
Teachers College, Columbia University alumni
City College of New York alumni
New York Hall of Science
Presidents of Bronx Community College